Bitterweed may refer to:

 Any plant in genus Ambrosia; specially Ambrosia artemisiifolia
 
 Helenium amarum, native to North America
 
 Tetraneuris